The Concerto for English Horn and Orchestra is a composition for solo English horn and orchestra by the American composer Ned Rorem.  The work was commissioned by the New York Philharmonic to commemorate the orchestra's sesquicentennial anniversary.  It was first performed by the soloist Thomas Stacy and the New York Philharmonic under the direction of Kurt Masur at Avery Fisher Hall on January 27, 1994.  Rorem dedicated the piece to Thomas Stacy.  The work is one of the few prominent contemporary English horn concertos, along with James MacMillan's The World's Ransoming.

Composition

Background
The concerto was written over the winter of 1991–1992, predominantly while Rorem was in the hospital.  Rorem described the composition process as "one of physical stress," adding, "when I worked at all it was through a hazy protestant need to meet deadlines."  The composer thus originally intended to call the piece Meditations in an Emergency after the eponymous poem by Frank O'Hara.  Rorem opted for a straightforward title, however, noting his lack of belief that "music, especially non-vocal music, necessarily reflects its maker's mood in medias res, or what people can agree—as they can with poetry and pictures—that a specific piece is angry or happy or noble, much less that it represents an ocean or an operating room."  He added, "When a gloomy composer labors on a lengthy project he checks the gloom at his studio door, along with his aches and pains, and functions in a kind of limbo. (A definition of the Artist: One who exists outside himself, and has something to show for it. He is the least egotistical of citizens)."

Given his lack of mobility, this was the first piece that Rorem composed directly onto paper without any keyboard instrument.  The work was started on December 6, 1991 and completed on June 13, 1992.  In the score program notes, he wrote:

Structure
The work has a duration of approximately 23 minutes and is cast in five movements:
Preamble and Amble
Love Letter
Recurring Dream
Perpetual Motion
Medley and Prayer

Instrumentation
The work is scored for solo English horn and an orchestra comprising two flutes (2nd doubling piccolo), two oboes, two clarinets, two bassoons, two horns, two trumpets, timpani, four percussionists, harp, piano (doubling celesta), and strings.

Reception
Reviewing the world premiere, Alex Ross of The New York Times wrote, "The concerto is simply a sequence of five sketches, with melody interspersed; the orchestral fabric is subtle enough for the mild-mannered English horn to assume a convincing solo role. Nothing goes on too long, and some movements seem too short."  He added:

See also
List of concertos for English horn

References

Concertos by Ned Rorem
1992 compositions
Rorem, Ned
Music commissioned by the New York Philharmonic